Choi Yun-chil (19 July 1928 – 8 October 2020) was a South Korean long-distance runner who was a two-time Olympian and a two-time national champion in the marathon.

Career
Choi led the marathon at the 1948 Summer Olympics in London before dropping out with less than 5 kilometers left in the race. He finished third in the 1950 Boston Marathon, but the Boston Athletic Association denied his entry into the following year's event. During the height of the Korean War, BAA President Walter A. Brown stated: "While American soldiers are fighting and dying in Korea, every Korean should be fighting to protect his country instead of training for marathons. As long as the war continues there, we positively will not accept Korean entries for our race on April 19." In 1952, Choi finished fourth in the Olympic marathon at Helsinki.

References

1928 births
2020 deaths
South Korean male long-distance runners
South Korean male middle-distance runners
Athletes (track and field) at the 1948 Summer Olympics
Athletes (track and field) at the 1952 Summer Olympics
Olympic athletes of South Korea
Asian Games medalists in athletics (track and field)
Athletes (track and field) at the 1954 Asian Games
Asian Games gold medalists for South Korea
Asian Games silver medalists for South Korea
Medalists at the 1954 Asian Games
20th-century South Korean people
21st-century South Korean people